Constantin Dumitru (29 April 1925 – 1992) was a Romanian athlete. He competed in the men's hammer throw at the 1952 Summer Olympics.

References

1925 births
1992 deaths
Athletes (track and field) at the 1952 Summer Olympics
Romanian male hammer throwers
Olympic athletes of Romania
Place of birth missing